The Gardiner Sisters are a family musical group from Concord, North Carolina. The group consists of sisters Hailey, Allie, Mandi, Lindsay, Abby and Lucy Gardiner. The sisters have over 80 million views on YouTube and are one of the most popular independent music artists on Spotify with over 220 million plays.

History
The group began in 2006 when they won the Mt. Pleasant's Got Talent July 4th singing competition. In 2009 they first started posting videos of themselves singing on YouTube. As of January 2018, the Gardiner Sisters' YouTube channel has more than 85 million total video views and over 650,000 subscribers. Their interpretation of the song "Let It Go" from the Disney movie Frozen was one of ABC News' Top 10 favorite renditions of "Let It Go" from 2014. The Gardiner Sisters have currently released five EPs and one album with covers. In April 2015, Hailey released her solo EP, titled The Woods, on Earth Day. In 2019, she released another EP called 'Where the roses bloom' and a single called 'Little Star'.

The popularity of the group's youtube channel reached its peak in 2014, which popularity was maintained until the beginning of 2017. The viewer numbers of the group's youtube videos have been declining since 2017 that may be attributed to several reasons (appearance on and focus shifted to other music platforms, Allie's retiring, changes of marketing strategy, unfortunate diverging from youtube trends).

Members
Hailey Camille (Gardiner) Brown | born  [Hailey also operates as group leader and creative mentor]
Amanda “Mandi” Claire Gardiner | born 
Lindsay Elizabeth Gardiner | born 
Abbigail “Abby” Marie Gardiner | born .
Lucy Violette Gardiner | born 

Past members
Alexandra "Allie" Jane (Gardiner) Glines | born  [Note: Allie is not singing anymore, she started her own Make Up Tutorial YouTube channel]

Discography
EPs
Gardiner Sisters (2009)
Merry Christmas (2013)
L.O.V.E. (2014)
Better (2014)
Nearer To Thee (2016)

Albums
Covers Volume 1 (2018)

References

External links
 
 

Musical groups from North Carolina
Latter Day Saints from North Carolina